

Television
The television stations received in Key West, Florida are the stations in the Miami-Fort Lauderdale Market, with rebroadcast transmitters in Key West and Marathon, Florida.

Radio

AM 
 WKWF 1600 - A full time 500 watt station. In 1945 this station signed on the air. It featured a variety of programming including variety in the 1950 and 1960s. Country and rock in the 1970s. Big Band and show tunes in the 1980s, and now the current format sports.
 WFFG 1300 - A full time 2500 watt station. This station is located in Marathon Florida (about 50 miles away). It still reaches Key West with a strong signal. It was a top 40 station in the 1970s Country in the 1980s. It currently has a talk format.

FM 
 WYBX 88.3 FM - The station broadcasts a Christian format, and is owned by the Bible Broadcasting Network, Inc.
 WYBW 88.3 FM - The station broadcasts a Christian format to Key Colony Beach, and is owned by the Bible Broadcasting Network, Inc.
 WEOW 92.7 FM - The first FM station in Key West. Originally on 92.5 FM, WFYN FM began with a beautiful music format till 1982. It became an adult contemporary format as "WOW 92.5". The station switched to Top 40/CHR in 1990.
 WKEY 93.7 FM - Originally a 3,000 watt station. Was the original frequency for WWUS FM. Boosted power to 33,000 watts in the 1990s. Has had the original light AC format since sign-on. Call letters changed from WKRY.
 WAVK 97.7 FM - This station went on the air as WDUC in 1995. Later that November 3, the station changed its call sign to WKTS, on 1999-09-09 to WWWK, and on 2003-10-23 to the current WAVK. The first real format of WWWK was pure dance music as "K97", before flipping to hot AC "Wave".
 WCNK 98.7 FM - Originally a rock station WOZN. Sold to the owners of WWUS FM and changed to jazz. The station now has a country format.
 WAIL 99.5 FM - This station was originally on 95.5 FM WVFK with an eclectic format. That transmitter site burned in the 1980s and was returned to the original owner. The station signed on with a country format. It was sold in the 1980s and was changed to an electric rock format. The tower was destroyed in a hurricane, and once again was returned to the original owners which switched the station to a top 40 format in 1986. Throughout the rest of the late 1980s, it was a rock-leaned Top 40 format. The station dropped its rock-leaned Top 40 format for an AOR and an adult rock format. The station is an affiliate of Rick Dees Weekly Top 40 according to Radio & Records during its Top 40 years. The station was sold once again and went bankrupt and was repossessed by the original owners once again. In the 1990s, the station was sold to Clear Channel, and is classic rock.
 WPIK 102.5 FM - This station signed on in 1991 with a hot country format. In 2003 it was changed to a Hot AC format through an LMA. In 2005 the station was sold again. The current format is Spanish.
 WWUS 104.1 FM- Originally at 104.7 US1 radio has always been a classic hits station. It was first as a Top 40/adult rock format before becoming an adult contemporary format in 1986. WWUS is an affiliate of Dan Ingram's Top 40 Satellite Survey. A format change in the 1990s lasted about two weeks, listeners protested, and the format was changed back.
WXKW 104.9 FM - The X Key West also knows as Key Weird Radio. This station plays Trop-Rock, Alternative Rock, Classic Rock, and local musicians. It can be heard online at xkeywest.com or keyweirdradio.com 
 WIIS 106.9 FM - This station signed on the air in August 1977 on 107.1 FM. In 1982, the station moved its dial to 106.9 FM and switched its format to an Adult Contemporary format in 1983. It was the first station to become Top 40/CHR in the Key West area. The station switched to CHR in 1985. It made such an impact that within a few months, 92.7 WFYN changed the format from B-EZ to Adult Contemporary.

See also
 List of newspapers in Florida

References
FCC.gov

Key West